Ctenacanthiformes is an extinct order of elasmobranch fish. They possessed ornamented fin spines at the front of their dorsal fins and cladodont-type dentition. Ctenacanths are typically thought to have existed from the Devonian to the Late Permian, becoming extinct in the Permian-Triassic extinction event. Members of the family Ctenacanthidae may have survived into the Cretaceous based on teeth found in deep water deposits of Valanginian age in France and Austria. The monophyly of the group has been questioned, with some studies recovering the group as a whole as paraphyletic or polyphyletic.

References

Prehistoric cartilaginous fish orders